Skip Woods (born December 4, 1969) is an American filmmaker. He has primarily worked in the action genre as the writer of the films Swordfish (2001), Hitman (2007), and A Good Day to Die Hard (2013), in addition to co-writing X-Men Origins: Wolverine (2009) and The A-Team (2010).

Personal life
Woods lives in Los Angeles, California.

Filmography

References

External links
 
 

American male screenwriters
American film producers
American film directors
Living people
1970 births